The Museum of the Republic of North Macedonia, formerly and still unofficially known as the Museum of Macedonia, is a national institution in North Macedonia and one of the oldest museums in the country. It is located in the Old Bazaar in Skopje, near the Skopje Fortress. The Museum of the Republic of North Macedonia was created by joining three museum in one. The three museum that were unified were the archaeological, historical and ethnological museum, of which the archaeological museum was the oldest one; it was opened in 1924 and that date is considered as an establishing date of the national museum. During the existence of the Socialist Republic of Macedonia, the museum was known as People's Museum of Macedonia.

The museum has got total area of 10.000 m², of which 6000 m² are meant for permanent or temporal exhibitions. The institution is of complex character, which means it gathers, keeps, conserves and presents the national Macedonian historical and cultural heritage. Within the museum is the Kuršumli An, a historical monument that was built in the 16th century. Besides that, the museum takes care about the collections of the following institutions as well:

the collections in the Palace of culture "Dragi Tozija" in Resen, 
the collections in the library "Iskra" in Kočani,
the collections in the Palace of culture "25 May" in Valandovo, and
the collections in the memorial houses in the villages Bituše, Galičnik and Gorno Vranovci.

Sections
The Museum of the Republic of North Macedonia is divided into the following departments or sections:
Department of Anthropology
Department of Archaeology 
Department of Ethnology
Department of History
Department of History of Arts
Department for conservation

References

External links

The evaluation of the Museum of Macedonia in Skopje, by Barbara Voponcov. 

Museums in North Macedonia
Museums established in 1924
National museums
Buildings and structures in Skopje
Old Bazaar, Skopje